The Church of Jesus Christ of Latter-day Saints in Singapore refers to the Church of Jesus Christ of Latter-day Saints (LDS Church) and its members in Singapore.

History

In May 1963, Gordon B. Hinckley then of the Quorum of the Twelve along with Jay A Quealy, President of the Southern Far East Mission, visited Singapore and found three Latter-day Saints from the British military residing there. Members from Hong Kong also came began holding church meetings in Singapore and by 1964, the number attending had grown to eleven. Missionaries began visiting in the mid 1960s and the first assigned full-time missionaries arrived in March 1968. On October 12 of the same year, the church established its first congregation in Singapore with John McSweeney as President. The Southeast Asia Mission, which included Singapore, was created in November 1969.

In 1970, when approximately 100 Latter-day Saints lived in Singapore, government officials restricted preaching and visas for missionaries. Progress continued through the efforts of local members and the Singapore Mission was created in 1974, with G. Carlos Smith as the mission president. By 1976, church membership in Singapore totaled 309. Singapore was re-opened to full-time missionaries in January 1980. Five years later, church membership in Singapore was 960. By 1990, the church had constructed three meetinghouses, which served approximately 1,300 members.

In August 1992, Jon Huntsman, Jr., a Latter-day Saint who had preached as a missionary in Taiwan, was sworn into office as the United States Ambassador to Singapore. By mid-1993, church membership in Singapore totaled 1,750 in seven congregations.

In 2021, church president Russell M. Nelson announced that a temple would be built in Singapore.

Stake and Congregations

As of February 2023, the Singapore stake consisted of the following congregations:
Compassvale Ward
Jurong Ward
Newton Ward
Sembawang Ward
Singapore 3rd Ward (Tagalog)
Singapore YSA Ward

Mission
In the 1960s, Singapore was part of the Southern Far East Mission. The Southeast Asia Mission, which included Singapore, was created in November 1969. It was renamed the Singapore Mission on July 24, 1974. The mission was discontinued and transferred to Indonesia Jakarta Mission in July, 1978, but reopened on January 1, 1980. The Singapore Mission is currently the only Mission of the LDS Church in Singapore and ministers to the entirety of Singapore and Malaysia.

Temples

See also

Religion in Singapore

Notes

External links
 The Church of Jesus Christ of Latter-day Saints - Official Site (Singapore)
 The Church of Jesus Christ of Latter-day Saints - Newsroom (Singapore)
 ComeUntoChrist.org Latter-day Saints Visitor site